Schwartz's Principles of Surgery  is a seminal textbook of surgery originally written by Seymour Schwartz, MD. The first edition was published in 1969 by the McGraw-Hill.  Latest edition  has published in 2019 as the 11th edition in textbook's 50th anniversary. Publication years, from newest to the oldest editions,  are 2019, 2015, 2010, 2005, 1999, 1994, 1989, 1984, 1979, 1974, 1969. It is one of the main textbooks for medical students  and junior surgical residents.

Contents 
Its ninth edition has 48 chapters.

References

External links 
 Access Medicine from McGraw-Hill

Medical manuals
Surgery
McGraw-Hill books
surgery